Listed below are the dates and results for the 1978 FIFA World Cup qualification rounds for the African zone (CAF). For an overview of the qualification rounds, see the article 1978 FIFA World Cup qualification.

A total of 26 CAF teams entered the competition. The African Zone was allocated 1 place (out of 16) in the final tournament.

Format
There would be five rounds of play:
Preliminary Round, First Round, Second Round and Third Round: In each of these rounds, the teams were paired up to play knockout matches on a home-and-away basis. The winners would advance to the next round, until there would be 3 teams left.
Final Round: The 3 teams would play against each other on a home-and-away basis. The group winner would qualify.

Preliminary round

|}

Sierra Leone won 6–3 on agg. and advanced to the First Round.

Upper Volta won 3–1 on agg. and advanced to the First Round.

First round

|}

Algeria won 1–0 on agg. and advanced to the Second Round.

The aggregate score was tied 2–2, but Tunisia won 4–2 on penalties in the second leg to advance to the Second Round. This was the first penalty shootout in a World Cup match.

Togo won 2–1 on agg. and advanced to the Second Round.

The aggregate score was tied 3–3, and a play-off on neutral ground was played to decide who would advance to the Second Round.

Guinea advanced to the Second Round, via the play-off.

Nigeria won 6–2 on agg. and advanced to the Second Round.

Congo-Brazzaville won 4–2 on agg. and advanced to the Second Round.

Côte d'Ivoire won 3–1 on agg. and advanced to the Second Round.

Egypt won 5–1 on agg. and advanced to the Second Round.

Zambia won 5–0 on agg. and advanced to the Second Round.

Central African Republic withdrew, so Zaire advanced to the Second Round automatically.

Sudan withdrew, so Kenya advanced to the Second Round automatically.

Tanzania withdrew, so Uganda advanced to the Second Round automatically.

Second round

|}

Tunisia won 3–1 on agg. and advanced to the Third Round.

Guinea won 4–1 on agg. and advanced to the Third Round.

Ivory Coast won 6–3 on agg. and advanced to the Third Round.

Egypt won 1–0 on agg. and advanced to the Third Round.

Zambia won 4–3 on agg. and advanced to the Third Round.

Zaire withdrew, so Nigeria advanced to the Third Round automatically.

Third round

|}

Tunisia won 3–2 on agg. and advanced to the Final Round.

Nigeria won 6–2 on agg. and advanced to the Final Round.

Egypt won 2–0 on agg. and advanced to the Final Round.

Final round

Tunisia qualified.

Qualified teams

1 Bold indicates champions for that year. Italic indicates hosts for that year.

Goalscorers

6 goals

 Mahmoud El Khatib

4 goals

 Segun Odegbami

3 goals

 Kobenan Kouman
 Jérôme Lèbre Mamahou
 Mostafa Abdou
 Papa Camara
 Thompson Usiyan
 Mohamed Akid

2 goals

 Roger Milla
 Jean-Jacques N'Doumba
 Leon Goua G'Bize
 Farouk Gaafar
 Alloysius Atuegbu
 Godwin Iwelumo
 Kama Dumbuya
 Wasieu Sounomu
 Abderraouf Ben Aziza
 Khemais Labidi
 Témime Lahzami
 Joseph Kaboré
 Bernard Chanda
 Godfrey Chitalu
 Willie Phiri

1 goal

 Omar Betrouni
 Mahmoud Guendouz
 Jean Manga Onguéné
 Jonas Bahamboula
 Daniel Ebomoa
 Pierre Lingongo
 Joseph Mounoudzi
 Joseph Wamba
 Gaston Bawa
 Lucien Kouassi Kouame
 Pascal Miézan
 Ahmed Abdel Baki
 Maher Hammam
 Ossama Khalil
 Mokhtar Mokhtar
 Tekalinge Kassahun
 Opoku Afriyle
 Ofei Ansah
 Ibrahim Kassum
 Ousmane Badara Bangoura
 Youssuf Camara
 Mamadou Aliou Keita
 Chérif Souleymane
 Ali Sylla
 Ismael Sylla
 Seydouba Sylla
 Ousmane Thiam Tollo
 Gagny Coulibaly
 Abdelghani Lakhal
 Mustapha Tahir
 Boukari Adamou
 Moussa Kanfideni
 Sanda Seydou
 Adokie Amiesimaka
 Kunle Awesu
 Christian Chukwu
 Kelechi Emeteole
 Johnny N'Wadioha
 Samuel Ojebode
 Abdoulaye Ba
 Ismail Dyfan
 Mohammed Sama
 William Sango
 Samuel Tray
 Anani Afanou
 Tabania Ametepé
 Alirou Rachidou
 Tarak Dhiab
 Amor Jebali
 Néjib Liman
 Ali Kaabi
 Moncef Khouini
 Abdulla Nasur
 Denis Obua
 Polly Ouma
 Joseph Ouattara
 Kouligo Zoma
 Alex Chola
 Obby Kapita

1 own goal

 Jack Chamangwana (playing against Zambia)
 Godwin Odiye (playing against Tunisia)

See also
1978 FIFA World Cup qualification
1978 FIFA World Cup qualification (UEFA)
1978 FIFA World Cup qualification (CONCACAF)
1978 FIFA World Cup qualification (CONMEBOL)
1978 FIFA World Cup qualification (AFC and OFC)

Notes

External links
 1978 FIFA World Cup qualification (CAF) at FIFA.com

CAF
FIFA World Cup qualification (CAF)
Qual
Qual
qual